Bishkain (Bişqayın; , Pişkayăn) is a rural locality (a selo) and the administrative centre of Bishkainsky Selsoviet, Aurgazinsky District, Bashkortostan, Russia. The population was 1,150 as of 2010. There are 15 streets.

Geography 
Bishkain is located 18 km southeast of Tolbazy (the district's administrative centre) by road. Belogorsky is the nearest rural locality.

References 

Rural localities in Aurgazinsky District
Ufa Governorate